In molecular biology the B-box-type zinc finger domain is a short protein domain of around 40 amino acid residues in length. B-box zinc fingers can be divided into two groups, where types 1 and 2 B-box domains differ in their consensus sequence and in the spacing of the 7-8 zinc-binding residues. Several proteins contain both types 1 and 2 B-boxes, suggesting some level of cooperativity between these two domains.

Occurrence
B-box domains are found in over 1500 proteins from a variety of organisms. They are found in TRIM (tripartite motif) proteins that consist of an N-terminal RING finger (originally called an A-box), followed by 1-2 B-box domains and a coiled-coil domain (also called RBCC for Ring, B-box, Coiled-Coil). TRIM proteins contain a type 2 B-box domain, and may also contain a type 1 B-box. In proteins that do not contain RING or coiled-coil domains, the B-box domain is primarily type 2. Many type 2 B-box proteins are involved in ubiquitinylation. Proteins containing a B-box zinc finger domain include transcription factors, ribonucleoproteins and proto-oncoproteins; for example, MID1, MID2, TRIM9, TNL, TRIM36, TRIM63, TRIFIC, NCL1 and CONSTANS-like proteins.

The microtubule-associated E3 ligase MID1 (EC) contains a type 1 B-box zinc finger domain. MID1 specifically binds Alpha-4, which in turn recruits the catalytic subunit of phosphatase 2A (PP2Ac). This complex is required for targeting of PP2Ac for proteasome-mediated degradation. The MID1 B-box coordinates two zinc ions and adopts a beta/beta/alpha cross-brace structure similar to that of ZZ, PHD, RING and FYVE zinc fingers.

Homologs
Prokaryotic homologs of the domain are present in several bacterial lineages and methanogenic archaea, and often show fusions to peptidase domains such as the rhomboid-like serine peptidase, and Zn-dependent metallopeptidase. Other versions typically contain transmembrane helices and might also show fusions to domains such as DNAJ, FHA, SH3, WD40 and tetratricopeptide repeats. Together these associations suggest a role for the prokaryotic homologs of the B-box zinc finger domain in proteolytic processing, folding or stability of membrane-associated proteins.  The domain architectural syntax is remarkably similar to that seen in prokaryotic homologs of the AN1 zinc finger and LIM domains.

References

External links
CO-like family, DBB family at PlantTFDB: Plant Transcription Factor Database

See also
 Zinc finger

Protein domains